Leif Pettersson, born in 1954, is a Swedish politician of the Social Democratic Party. He has been a member of the Riksdag since 2006.

External links 
Riksdagen: Leif Pettersson (s)

Members of the Riksdag from the Social Democrats
Living people
1954 births
Date of birth missing (living people)
Members of the Riksdag 2006–2010
Members of the Riksdag 2010–2014
Members of the Riksdag 2014–2018